European route E 692 is a European B class road in Georgia, connecting the E 60 and E 70 roads, bypassing the Black Sea city of Poti. The E 692 is officially listed between the cities of Batumi and Samtredia, and is part of the East-West Highway project in Georgia, a major investment into Georgia's international road connectivity. In the context of that project the entire 57 km S12 highway in the E 692 will be upgraded to motorway standards.

Route 
 
: Grigoleti - Lanchuti - Samtredia

External links 
 UN Economic Commission for Europe: Overall Map of E-road Network (2007)

References

International E-road network
Georgia